A Horse Fly Fleas is a 1947 Warner Bros. Looney Tunes cartoon short. It was written by Warren Foster and directed by Robert McKimson. The short was released on December 13, 1947.

The short stars A. Flea, the nearly-microscopic protagonist of An Itch in Time from 1943. It is rarely aired today due to stereotypical portrayals of Native Americans.

Originally released in Cinecolor, the cartoon was reissued in three-strip Technicolor during the 1955–56 season.

Plot

Home media
This cartoon was released on DVD and Blu-ray with the original titles and Cinecolor version restored on the Looney Tunes Platinum Collection: Volume 2.

References

External links

1947 animated films
1947 short films
1947 films
1940s Warner Bros. animated short films
Looney Tunes shorts
Films directed by Robert McKimson
Animated films about insects
Films scored by Carl Stalling
Film controversies
Native American-related controversies
Race-related controversies in animation
Race-related controversies in film
Cinecolor films
Films produced by Edward Selzer